Nodosauridae is a family of ankylosaurian dinosaurs, from the Late Jurassic to the Late Cretaceous period in what is now North America, South America, Europe, and Asia.

Description

Nodosaurids, like their close relatives the ankylosaurids, were heavily armored dinosaurs adorned with rows of bony armor nodules and spines (osteoderms), which were covered in keratin sheaths. All nodosaurids, like other ankylosaurians, were medium-sized to large, heavily built, quadrupedal, herbivorous dinosaurs, possessing small, leaf-shaped teeth. Unlike ankylosaurids, nodosaurids lacked mace-like tail clubs, instead having flexible tail tips. Many nodosaurids had spikes projecting outward from their shoulders. One particularly well-preserved nodosaurid "mummy", the holotype of Borealopelta markmitchelli, preserved a nearly complete set of armor in life position, as well as the keratin covering and mineralized remains of the underlying skin, which indicate reddish dorsal pigments in a countershading pattern.

Classification
The family Nodosauridae was erected by Othniel Charles Marsh in 1890, and anchored on the genus Nodosaurus.

The clade Nodosauridae was first informally defined by Paul Sereno in 1998 as "all ankylosaurs closer to Panoplosaurus than to Ankylosaurus," a definition followed by Vickaryous, Teresa Maryańska, and Weishampel in 2004. Vickaryous et al. considered two genera of nodosaurids to be of uncertain placement (incertae sedis): Struthiosaurus and Animantarx, and considered the most primitive member of the Nodosauridae to be Cedarpelta. Following the publication of the PhyloCode, Nodosauridae needed to be formally defined following certain parameters, including that the type genus Nodosaurus was required as an internal specifier. In formally naming Nodosauridae, Madzia and colleagues followed the previously established use for the clade, defining it as the largest clade including Nodosaurus textilis but not Ankylosaurus magniventris. As all phylogenies referenced included both Panoplosaurus and Nodosaurus within the same group relative to Ankylosaurus, the addition of another internal specifier was deemed unnecessary. The 2018 phylogenetic analysis of Rivera-Sylva and colleagues was used as the primary reference for Panoplosaurini by Madzia et al., in addition to the supplemental analyses of Thompson et al. (2012), Arbour and Currie (2016), Arbour et al. (2016), and Brown et al. (2017).

The highly isolated Antarctopelta, from the late Cretaceous of Antarctica, was previously thought to be the most basal nodosaurid, but a 2021 study found it to belong to the Parankylosauria, a separate basal lineage of ankylosaurs restricted to the Southern Hemisphere. However, the 2022 description of Patagopelta, a nodosaurine from South America, suggests that true nodosaurids also inhabited Gondwana, having colonized South America during a biotic interchange from North America during the Campanian.

Biogeography
The near simultaneous appearance of nodosaurids in both North America and Europe is worthy of consideration. Europelta is the oldest nodosaurid from Europe, it is derived from the lower Albian Escucha Formation. The oldest western North American nodosaurid is Sauropelta, from the lower Albian Little Sheep Mudstone Member of the Cloverly Formation, at an age of 108.5±0.2 million years. Eastern North American fossils seem older. Teeth of Priconodon crassus from the Arundel Clay of the Potomac Group of Maryland, which dates near the Aptian–Albian boundary. The Propanoplosaurus hatchling from the base of the underlying Patuxent Formation, dating to the upper Aptian, is the oldest known nodosaurid.

See also

 Timeline of ankylosaur research

References

Further reading 
 Carpenter, K. (2001). "Phylogenetic analysis of the Ankylosauria." In Carpenter, K., (ed.) 2001: The Armored Dinosaurs. Indiana University Press, Bloomington & Indianapolis, 2001, pp. xv-526
 Osi, Attila (2005). Hungarosaurus tormai, a new ankylosaur (Dinosauria) from the Upper Cretaceous of Hungary. Journal of Vertebrate Paleontology 25(2):370-383, June 2003.

External links

 Alberta oilsands discovery of 2011

 
Kimmeridgian first appearances
Maastrichtian extinctions
Taxa named by Othniel Charles Marsh
Prehistoric dinosaur families